Launceston Church Grammar School (informally Launceston Grammar or simply Grammar, commonly abbreviated to LCGS) is an Anglican co-educational private school in Launceston, Tasmania, Australia for Early Learning through to Grade 12.

Although founded in 1846, the present school was formed in 1983 from the amalgamation of the boys' Launceston Grammar School and girls' Broadland House Church of England Girls' Grammar School. The school celebrated its 170th birthday on 15 June 2016 and retains its longevity, being the longest continuously running independent school in Australia and Tasmania, and being the oldest form of private secondary education in Tasmania. The school is also the second-oldest form of education in Tasmania, after Christ College, Tasmania, the oldest form of education in Australia, now used as a residential college of the University of Tasmania.

Launceston Grammar is affiliated with Association of Heads of Independent Schools of Australia (AHISA), the Independent Primary School Heads of Australia (IPSHA), the Australian Boarding Schools' Association (ABSA), and the Sports Association of Tasmanian Independent Schools (SATIS).

The school competes mainly with Scotch Oakburn College and St Patrick's College, Launceston for student numbers, the three being the only large-scale private schools in Launceston.

The school is widely regarded as one of Australia's most prestigious schools: from 2001 to 2004 The Australian listed Launceston Church Grammar School among the top ten schools in the country, and in 2010 The Age reported that Launceston Grammar ranked equal tenth among Australian schools based on the number of alumni who had received a top Order of Australia honour.

History 

On 15 June 1846, the school was founded and Henry Plow Kane was chosen as its founding headmaster. The school began in temporary premises on the North-East corner of George and Elizabeth Streets, but soon after commenced building on the site immediately behind St John's Church. And so began an enduring and close relationship between St John's Church and the Launceston Church Grammar School.

On the day after Grammar opened its doors, 24 boys of varying ages were enrolled and Launceston was described as "a small town with a population of about 8000 people and the town was little more than a scattered village." In 1848 the visitor, the first Anglican Bishop of Tasmania, Francis Russell Nixon, came to the school and a soiree was held in his honour. The current bishop of Tasmania continues this tradition as the visitor and comes annually to the school.

An independent school known as Launceston High School existed from 1884 until 1912. It was founded by Edward Alleyne Nathan, who had been a teacher at Launceston Church Grammar School. This school was established at Milton Hall in Frederick Street, Launceston. Nathan remained as headmaster of the school until 1899, when he was succeeded by R. Ernest Smith. Launceston High School eventually merged with Launceston Church Grammar School. The alumni of both schools held joint reunions as the Old Launcestonians' Association after the schools merger.

In 1896, Launceston Church Grammar School celebrated its 50th year under the headmasters the Revd Christopher Wilkinson and Mr Harry Gillett with a jubilee service at St John's and a grand ceremony in the Albert Hall. By 1920 the school had outgrown its site, and in 1924 its ninth headmaster, John Bethune, presided over the only major move in the school's history when it went from Elizabeth Street to a new 25-acre site on Stephenson's Farm in Mowbray – purchased for 2,000 pounds.

The school community suffered deeply during the war years as students served their country, many making the ultimate sacrifice. Headmaster, Captain Norman Roff was amongst those killed in World War II action. The next major milestone for the school was its centenary in 1946 under Headmaster Harold Vernon Jones. Although the school by now had built its own chapel, history records that "the final Centenary celebration was a church service held in the original church which School members attended, and two hundred present scholars and two hundred and fifty Old Boys lined up outside the old School in Elizabeth Street and marched to St John's Church, as Grammar boys had done for so many years." This was an emotional occasion for many Old Boys as they relived their youth, and the bishop gave an inspiring address to the congregation of a thousand, telling them they must develop international fellowship.

The past 50 years have brought further major milestones for the school. One was the move to co-education in 1972. Although 100 years before, in 1872, two girls Edith Savigny and Mary Archer both attended Grammar for several years. In 1899, the enrolment was recorded as 150 boys and one girl – Joyce Wilkinson. In 1921, Charlie Irvine, daughter of the Matron, Mrs Irvine, also attended the school. In 1983 Grammar amalgamated with the Broadland House Church of England Girls' Grammar School. Broadland House itself having a fine heritage and its beginning in the 1840s. Broadland House is honoured with a memorial window in St John's Church. This amalgamation, although a shift from Grammar's past heritage as a school for boys, provided a strong foundation for the future chapters of the school's history. Since 1983, Broadland has carried on its proud educational tradition as the Broadland Campus – the Junior section of the school.

The school has a long and proud heritage and has savoured the successes and transcended the difficulties and challenges. The vision of the school's founders has proved sound. In 1996, the school celebrated its Sesquicentenary, and celebrated its 160th year since foundation in 2006. The school also celebrated its 170th year of continuous operation in 2016.

Headmasters

Campuses 

The Senior Campus is located in the suburb of Mowbray Heights, Launceston and caters for students in Grades 7 – 12. This site includes the School Chapel, Poimena Art Gallery, School Hall, Gymnasium, Boarding House and Swimming Pool. The chapel is a popular location for weddings.

The Junior Campus is located at the old Broadland House site on the corner of Lyttleton Street and Elphin Road, East Launceston. The campus was redeveloped in 2010.

House system 

At the beginning of 1924, Launceston Grammar moved to the campus at Mowbray Heights. With new quarters, the house system was inaugurated by the headmaster, the Revd John Bethune. Four houses were created and named in honour of the Revd William Savigny, the Revd Christopher Wilkinson and Mr Harry Gillett, former headmasters; and Mr William Hawkes, a generous benefactor. In 1959, an additional day house was formed and named in honour of former headmaster, Mr Norman Roff. The large number of boarders at the Senior School in 1961 made it necessary to introduce another house for purposes of administration. This was Fraser House and was named in honour of the late Mr Hugh Fraser MBE, who had been actively associated with the school for fifty-six years. Fraser House ceased operation in 1970 until 1997. In 1998, under headmaster Mr. Peter Welch, the boarding house was renamed Hawkes House and two new day houses were created; Fraser House and Savigny House. In 2001 Hawkes House discontinued as an entity for house competition and the boarders were reallocated across the five other houses. The name Hawkes is retained as the name of the boarding house.

Fraser House
 Motto: "Summum Bonum" (The highest good)
 Named after: Mr Hugh Fraser MBE, Acting Headmaster from 1928 to 1929
 Years in operation: 1961–1970, 1997–present
 Colour: Green
Gillett House
 Motto: "Nulli Secundus" (Second to none)
 Named after: Mr Harry Gillett, former Headmaster 
 Years in operation: 1924–present
 Colour: Red
Hawkes House (Boys' and Girls' Boarding Houses)
 Motto: "Per Proelia Ad Gloriam" (Through battle to glory)
 Named after: Mr William Hawkes, school benefactor 
 Years in operation: 1924–1996 (as Hawkes-Savigny), 1997–present (as Hawkes)
 Colour: White
Roff House
 Motto: "Meliora Sequamur" (Let us seek better things)
 Named after: Capt. Norman Roff, former headmaster
 Years in operation: 1959–present
 Colour: Gold
Savigny House
 Motto: "Nil Desperandum" (Never give up home)
 Named after: Revd William Savigny, former headmaster
 Years in operation: 1924–1996 (as Hawkes-Savigny), 1997–present (as Savigny)
 Colour: Royal Blue
Wilkinson House
 Motto: "Sans Peur et Sans Reproche" (Without fear and without reproach)
 Named after: Revd Christopher Wilkinson, former headmaster
 Years in operation: 1924–present
 Colour: Black

Sport 
Launceston Church Grammar School is a member of the Sports Association of Tasmanian Independent Schools (SATIS).

SATIS premierships 
Launceston Church Grammar School has won the following SATIS premierships.

Combined:

 Swimming (5) - 2008, 2009, 2011, 2012, 2013

Boys:

 Athletics - 1973
 Cricket (30) - 1924, 1925, 1927, 1935, 1943, 1944, 1945, 1947, 1948, 1950, 1951, 1953, 1954, 1955, 1957, 1959, 1960, 1961, 1966, 1972, 1976, 1982, 1983, 1988, 1992, 2000, 2008, 2009, 2011, 2019
 Football (6) - 1963, 1965, 1970, 1971, 1978, 1998
 Hockey (2) - 1964, 1966
 Rowing - 1978
 Rowing Eight (18) - 1919, 1920, 1921, 1922, 1925, 1936, 1938, 1946, 1947, 1952, 1954, 1955, 1956, 1963, 1976, 1977, 1978, 1979
 Soccer - 2000
 Swimming (12) - 1962, 1970, 1971, 1972, 1973, 1974, 1975, 2009, 2011, 2012, 2013, 2014
 Tennis (7) - 1976, 1977, 1978, 1979, 1990, 1997, 1999

Girls:

 Athletics (2) - 1987, 2008
 Basketball (4) - 2009, 2010, 2012, 2013
 Hockey (5) - 1984, 1985, 1987, 1988, 1989
 Rowing - 2013
 Rowing Eight (6) - 2005, 2010, 2011, 2012, 2013, 2014
 Soccer (2) - 2018, 2021
 Softball (8) - 1982, 1989, 1995, 1996, 1997, 2002, 2015, 2016
 Swimming - 2008
 Tennis (6) - 1985, 1986, 1987, 1992, 1994, 1995

Student leadership

The Prefect body consists of School Captains, School Vice-Captains and School Prefects. Other student leaders include house leaders, school whips, captains of sports teams and co-curricular activities, peer mentors, asthma peer leaders, activities leaders, school magazine editors, and members of the Student Representative Council (SRC).

National and international links
One of the Launceston Church Grammar School's aims is to provide a globally relevant education. As such, the school is home to many international students, and has formed international links with countries including:

 Bolivia
 England
 France
 Germany
 India 
 Ireland
 Japan
 Nepal
 New Caledonia 
 Scotland 
 Singapore
 South Africa
 Tanzania 
 United States of America

Several exchanges also take place during the year, to countries including England, the United States, Germany and Japan. The school is, in turn, visited each year by three international schools, six mainland schools, and four other Tasmanian schools.

The school's past and present sister and brother schools include Hutchins School, St Michael's Collegiate School, Geelong Grammar School, Melbourne Grammar School, Charterhouse School, Eton College, Harrow School, Rugby School, St Paul's School, Sherborne School for Girls, Shrewsbury School, Westminster Abbey Choir School, Winchester College, Osaka International School and The Barstow School.

Notable alumni
Alumni of the Launceston Church Grammar School (and its predecessors) are known as Old Launcestonians. All students who have attended Launceston Grammar automatically become members of the Old Launcestonians' Association (OLA), the organisation which represents former scholars of the school. Grade 12 valedicts are awarded life membership of the OLA, and honorary membership is bestowed upon all staff members who serve 10 years or more.

Business

 Sir Lindesay Clark – Mining engineer and company director 
 Sir Norman Coles – former managing director and chairman of the Coles Group, and deputy chairman of Kmart Australia
 Sir Raymond Ferrall – Tasmanian businessman and author
 Sir Hudson Fysh – founder of Qantas
 Sir Warren McDonald KBE – Tasmanian engineer and industrialist 
 Sir Donald von Bibra – former chairman of the Australian Wool Industry Conference and Tasmanian grazier 
 David Warren AO – Inventor of the Flight data recorder
* 
 John Youl – Tasmanian grazier and motor racing driver

Clergy

 Oliver Heyward – former Anglican Bishop of Bendigo
 David McCall – former Anglican Bishop of Willochra and Bishop of Bunbury
 Cecil Muschamp – former Anglican Bishop of Kalgoorlie and Dean of Brisbane

Entertainment, media and the arts

 Jack Carington Smith – Visual artist 
 Rafe Champion – writer
 Pip Courtney – journalist and television personality 
 Bob Danvers-Walker – Radio and newsreel announcer 
 Don Kay – classical composer 
 Scott Millwood – AFI Award-winning documentary film director of Wildness (2003) and Whatever Happened to Brenda Hean? (2008)
 Indira Naidoo – journalist and former SBS newsreader
 
 Peter Sculthorpe – Australian composer, orchestral and chamber musician

Government, politics and the law

 Arthur Anderson – Labor politician 
 Brian Archer – Liberal Senator for Tasmania
 Bridget Archer – Liberal politician and current MP for Bass
 Thomas Archer IV – Longford councillor, landowner and grazier 
 John Avery – former barrister who defended Martin Bryant
 Guy Barnett – Liberal politician
 Arthur Beck – UAP politician and Hobart alderman 
 Sir Angus Bethune – former premier of Tasmania
 Sir Henry Braddon KBE – Diplomat, businessman and rugby union player
 Cyril Cameron – AIF colonel and Liberal politician 
 Norman Cameron – Tasmanian politician 
 Richard Casey – Queensland politician 
 Bob Cheek – former Tasmanian Opposition Leader
 George Collins – Tasmanian politician and lawyer 
 Ewan Crawford – former chief justice of Tasmania and lieutenant governor
 Sir George Crawford – former justice of the Supreme Court of Tasmania
 Sir John George Davies – Tasmanian politician and cricketer 
 Charles Fenton – former President of the Tasmanian Legislative Council
 Janie Finlay – Alderman and former mayor of Launceston
 Stephen FitzGerald AO – Diplomat and former Australian Ambassador to China
 Francis Foster – Tasmanian politician
 Sir Guy Green – former governor of Tasmania and Chief Justice of Tasmania
 Ralph Harry – jurist, diplomat and former Australian ambassador to the United Nations 
 Ross Hart – Labor politician and lawyer
 William Hartnoll – Tasmanian politician and businessman  
 Sir Denham Henty – Tasmanian politician 
 Sir Barry Holloway – Papua New Guinean politician 
 Eric Hutchinson – Liberal politician and current administrator of Norfolk Island
 John William Israel – former Commonwealth Auditor-General
 Sir Claude James – Tasmanian politician, former Agent-General in London and Mayor of Launceston
 Peter Jones – West Australian politician
 John Loone – Tasmanian politician
 John Marriott – Liberal senator and Assistant Minister
 Sir Laurence McIntyre – former Australian Ambassador to Malaya, Indonesia, Japan and the United Nations
 Helen Morgan – NSW District Court judge 
 Campbell Newman – former Lord Mayor of Brisbane and Premier of Queensland
 Peter Rae AO – Liberal senator
 Neil Robson – Tasmanian politician who proposed the Robson Rotation
 Jeremy Rockliff – Deputy Premier of Tasmania
 T. J. Ryan (former teacher) – former premier of Queensland
 Tony Rundle – former premier of Tasmania
 Burford Sampson – Liberal politician 
 Warwick Smith – Liberal politician 
 Albert Solomon – former premier of Tasmania
 Alison Standen – Labor politician 
 John Steer (politician) – Liberal politician
 Allan Taylor – former director of ASIO and diplomat
 John Tucker – Liberal politician
 David Wordsworth – Liberal politician 
 Richard Youl – Public servant, coroner and surgeon

Military

 Mary Bell – Founding leader of the Women's Air Training Corps (WATC) 
 Richard Lamacraft – former director of intelligence operations and rear admiral of the Royal Australian Navy
 David Mattingley – bomber pilot and Distinguished Flying Cross recipient

Science

 Elizabeth Blackburn – Nobel laureate and biologist 
 Derek Denton – Research scientist 
 Mollie Holman – Physiologist and fellow of the Australian Academy of Science
 Hedley Wright – Australia's first professor of bacteriology

Sport

 Gabe Bell – Australian cricketer
 Justin Boocock – Olympic slalom canoeist 
 David Boon – Test cricketer
 George Bailey – Test cricketer, former captain of Australian T20 team and member of Australian ODI team
 George Challis – VFL footballer 
 Rochford Devenish-Meares – VFL footballer 
 James Faulkner – Cricketer for Tasmania, Australia and Rajasthan Royals
 Peter Faulkner – first-class Cricketer for Australia 
 Brad Green – Development coach (Carlton Football Club) and former AFL player (Melbourne Demons)
 David Lean – Olympic silver medallist and Commonwealth Games gold medalists in 4 × 400 m relay and 440-yard hurdles
 Ryan Lees – Australian cricketer 
 Guy Le Marchand – English cricketer 
 David Macpherson – Tennis doubles specialist
 Kate Pedley – Professional runner and triathlete
 Ted Pickett – Cricketer for Tasmania
 Claude Rock – first-class Cricketer for Cambridge 
 Basil Travers (former Headmaster) – Cricketer and England National rugby player
 Tom Triffitt – Cricketer for Western Australia and Perth Scorchers 
 Ciona Wilson – national representative rower 
 Joe Wilson – VFA footballer and MCC cricketer 
 Simon Youl – International tennis player

Rhodes Scholars

The school has produced a large number of students who have gone on to be awarded the prestigious Rhodes Scholarship, an international postgraduate award for selected foreign students to study at the University of Oxford. Many prizes given by the school hold criteria similar to the Rhodes Scholarship. The following alumni have been selected as Rhodes Scholars: 
 Leonard Neil Morrison (1904) (St John's)
 John Orr (1905) (Balliol)
 Arthur Herbert Clerke (1907) (Hertford)
 William John Howard (1912) (Trinity)
 Laurence Rupert McIntyre (1933) (Exeter)
 Ralph Lindsay Harry (1938) (Lincoln)
 Ronald Cecil Gates (1946) (Keble)
 Oliver Spencer Heyward (1949) (Oriel)
 Dennis John Rose (1958) (Jesus)
 Philip Anthony Vere Roff (1960) (New College)
 Roger Dennis Scott (1961) (Lincoln)
 Allan Robert Taylor (1963) (Balliol)
 Richard John Dumaresq Gee (1967) (St John's)
 Benjamin Jervis Goold (1994) (Corpus Christi)
 Francisco Fernando Ascui (1996) (St Peter's)
 Elizabeth Murray (2011) (New College)
 James Allen Haw (2016) (St Antony's)

See also
 List of schools in Tasmania
List of boarding schools
 Education in Tasmania

References

External links 
 Launceston Church Grammar School website

Educational institutions established in 1846
Anglican high schools in Tasmania
Boarding schools in Tasmania
Rock Eisteddfod Challenge participants
Junior School Heads Association of Australia Member Schools
Schools in Launceston, Tasmania
1846 establishments in Australia